Spain–Thailand relations are the bilateral and diplomatic relations between these two countries. Thailand has an embassy in Madrid and two honorary consulates in Barcelona and Santa Cruz de Tenerife. Spain has an embassy in Bangkok.

Historical and diplomatic relations 
The first contacts between Spain and the Kingdom of Siam date back to the 16th century when Tello de Aguirre led a trade mission from Philippines. The main result of it was, according to some historians, the signing of a Treaty that recognized the Spaniards their right to reside, negotiate and practice their religion in Ayuttaya, then capital of the Kingdom of Siam.

In 1870 both Kingdoms formalized their relations with the signing of a Treaty of Friendship, Commerce and Navigation. The main consequence of the Treaty was the creation of a Consulate of Spain in Bangkok, designed by the architect Adolfo Paxton, who led a Diplomatic Mission sent from China.

The contacts and common interests continued to be reduced, despite the historic visit to Spain of the King of Thailand Chulalongkorn in 1897 where he was received by the Regent Queen Maria Cristina. In 1925 a new Treaty of Friendship, Commerce and Navigation would be signed.

After the Spanish Civil War and the Second World War, diplomatic relations were suspended until their resumption in 1950. Fernando Vázquez Mendes would become the first Spanish diplomat with permanent residence in Bangkok.

In 1955 the Prime Minister of Thailand, Marshal Pibul Songgran, officially visited Spain. In 1960, the Kings of Thailand, Bhumibol and Sirikit,
They made a state visit to Spain. A year later, Spain raised its representation in Bangkok to the status of the Embassy. In 1962, Don Santiago
Ruiz Tabanera was accredited as the first Ambassador of Spain in Thailand.

Official contacts were relaunched with the arrival of democracy in Spain. The highlights were State visits of the Kings of Spain to Thailand in 1987 and 2006. From that moment, Spain and Thailand maintain good relations based on the deep friendship between the two monarchies.

In October 2010, the Minister of Foreign Affairs of Thailand, Kasit Piromya, visited Spain. The highlight of this visit was the signing of a Joint Action Plan
(2010-2015) which included the main areas of bilateral relations between Spain and Thailand.

In 2021, Spain made a great effort to help Thailand with a donation of vaccines against COVID-19.

Economic relations 

The bilateral trade balance has traditionally been deficient for Spain. The impact of the international financial crisis coincided with an increase in Spanish sales in Thailand, growing by 28.5% in 2010 and 24% in 2011. In 2012, that growth slowed 3.57%, bringing the value of Exports amounted to 415.6 M // €. These data confirm the consolidation of Thailand as the second Spanish destination market in ASEAN, after Singapore.

The trade balance deficit between Spain and Thailand amounted to €439 million in 2012, 39.5% lower than in 2011. The coverage rate rose in 2012 to 48.6%, from 35.6% in 2011. In 2013, coverage with Thailand was 58.4%, which represents an improvement of 10% compared to 2012. In this way, the deficit of the Spain-Thailand trade balance stood at 334.3 in 2013 million euros, 24% less than in 2012. In 2014, the trade exchange deficit between the two countries rose again 34% over the previous year, standing at €453 million. The coverage rate fell to a percentage close to 2012, 48.3%.

Spain exported €424.3 M in Thailand in 2014, compared to 469.3M in 2013. The most exported tariff items were: automotive components (12.42%); female clothing (5.70%); steel products (5.28%); frozen fish (5.02%) and the item that includes products not included in another sector (4.90%).

For its part, Spain imported from Thailand worth €876.9 million in 2014, and €806.4 million in 2013, which represented an increase of 8.7%. The main Spanish import items during 2014 were: raw materials and semi-manufactured rubber (9.7%); air conditioning (8.8%); motorcycles and bicycles (7.7%); organic chemistry (6.2%); female clothing (5.5%) and automotive components (5%).

Tourism 
In 2014, Thailand received around 116,000 Spanish tourists, which meant a slight decrease compared to 123,490 in 2013. These data place Spain as the 30 issuing market, behind countries such as the United Kingdom or Germany that sent 906,312 and 744,363 tourists respectively. The majority of tourists visiting Thailand come from Asia, especially from Mainland China, Malaysia and Japan.

For its part, the number of Thais who visited Spain in 2014 amounted to 22,905, compared to 16,299 in 2013.

Cooperation 
Thailand is a middle-income country that is not among the priorities of Spanish cooperation, so cooperation activities have been
limited to small projects by local entities and autonomous communities.

Special chapter is the teaching of the Spanish language. In March 2013, AECID signed three Memoranda of Understanding with universities
Chulalongkorn, Ramkhamhaeng, and Thammasat. Thanks to agreements, during the 2013–2014 academic year three Spanish readers were incorporated to the mentioned Thai universities.

See also 
 Foreign relations of Spain
 Foreign relations of Thailand

References 

 
Thailand
Spain